"You + Me = Love" is a 1976 disco song recorded by The Undisputed Truth for Norman Whitfield's Whitfield Records.

Background
Norman Whitfield, producer and creator of The Undisputed Truth, had been at Motown Records for over a decade, and, in 1975, left to start up his own record label, Whitfield Records. The Undisputed Truth were the first act to follow him from Motown to Whitfield, after a line-up change. Tyrone "Big Ty" Douglas and the then-female lead singer Virginia "V" McDonald left. Taka Boom, Chaka Khan's sister, joined longtime member Joe Harris and 1974 additions Calvin "Dhaak" Stevenson and Tyrone "Lil Ty" Barkley. This group recorded The Truth's debut album for Whitfield Records, Method to the Madness, and are who appear on its cover.

Details
"You + Me = Love", featuring Taka Boom on lead, was released as The Undisputed Truth's first Whitfield single. It proved to be the group's second biggest success on the Pop Charts, behind only 1971's "Smiling Faces Sometimes". The song reached #48 on the Billboard Hot 100 and #37 on the R&B Charts. The track peaked at #5 on the National Disco Action, Top 40 chart.

Outside the US, the song was the group's one-and-only UK hit, peaking at #43 on the UK Singles Chart in early 1977.

References

1976 singles
Songs written by Norman Whitfield
Disco songs
Song recordings produced by Norman Whitfield
1976 songs